Derek Hobson (born 23 March 1949) is a TV and radio broadcaster and journalist, best known as the original host of ITV's New Faces, which introduced, among others, Lenny Henry, Victoria Wood, Jim Davidson, Les Dennis and Michael Barrymore to a Saturday night audience of more than 12 million viewers.

Hobson was also a continuity announcer for ATV in Birmingham and was one of the presenters of the regional news programme ATV Today.

After leaving ATV, Hobson co-presented Not For Women Only, a regional magazine programme for TVS, with Jill Cochrane. He also presented and co-created the format for the game show That's My Dog for TSW, which ran for four years on the ITV network from 1984.

Recently, he completed his first novel and screenplay and is currently researching a biography of an Irish impresario (his great uncle) who owned the world's oldest touring opera company.

References

External links
 .

Living people
1949 births
British radio personalities
British television personalities